Nilkuh Rural District is a rural district (dehestan) in the Central District of Galikash County, Golestan Province, Iran. At the 2006 census, its population was 3,239, in 818 families.  The rural district has 11 villages.

References 

Rural Districts of Golestan Province
Galikash County